Gondi is a South-Central Dravidian language, spoken by about three million Gondi people, chiefly in the Indian states of Madhya Pradesh, Maharashtra, Chhattisgarh, Andhra Pradesh, Telangana and by small minorities in neighbouring states. Although it is the language of the Gond people, it is highly endangered, with only one fifth of Gonds speaking the language. Gondi has a rich folk literature, examples of which are wedding songs and narrations. Gondi people are ethnically related to the Telugus.

Endangerment 
Although almost 13 million people returned themselves as Gonds on the 2011 census, however only 2.98 million recorded themselves as speakers of Gondi. The true number, however, is estimated to be several times higher, with some putting the figure as high as 20 million, because many Gondi speakers live in remote, Naxal-affected areas not reached by the census. In the present-day, large communities of Gondi speakers can be found in southeastern Madhya Pradesh (Betul, Chhindwara, Seoni, Balaghat, Mandla, Dindori and Jabalpur districts), eastern Maharashtra (Amravati, Nagpur, Yavatmal, Chandrapur, Gadchiroli and Gondia districts), northern Telangana (Adilabad, Komaram Bheem, and Bhadradi Kothagudem districts), Bastar division of Chhattisgarh and Nabarangpur district of Odisha.

This is the result of a language shift from Gondi to regional languages in the majority of the Gondi population, especially those in the northern portion of their range. By the 1920s, half of Gonds had stopped speaking the language entirely. The language is under severe stress from dominant languages such as Hindi, Chhattisgarhi, Marathi and Odia due to their use in education and employment. In order to improve their situation, Gond households adopt the more prestigious dominant language and their children become monolingual in that language. Already in the 1970s, Gondi youth in places with increased contact with wider society had stopped speaking the language, seeing it as a relic of old times. The constant contact between speakers of Gondi and Indo-Aryan languages has resulted in massive Indo-Aryan borrowing in Gondi, found in vocabulary, grammar and syntax. In one survey in Anuppur district for instance, it was found the dialect of Gondi spoken there, known as dehati bhasha ('rural language'), was actually a mixture of Hindi and Chhattisgarhi rather than Gondi. However, the survey also found younger Gonds had a positive attitude towards speaking Gondi and saving the language from extinction. Another survey from areas throughout the Gond region found younger Gonds felt developing their mother tongue was less important, but there were still large numbers willing to help in its development. Some attempts at revitalization have included children's books and online videos.

Characteristics
Gondi has a two-gender system, substantives being either masculine or nonmasculine. Gondi has developed aspirated stops, distancing itself from its ancestor Proto-Dravidian.

Phonology

Consonants 

 Sounds  can be heard as alveo-palatal  before non-front vowels in some dialects.
  is realized as a retroflex sibilant  before a retroflex stop .
 An alveolar tap sound  can vary freely with a trill sound .
  is realized as a dental nasal  before a dental stop sound, a palatal nasal  before a palatal affricate, and a retroflex nasal  before a retroflex stop. Elsewhere, it is articulated as an alveolar nasal .
  is realized as an approximant  when occurring before back vowels.
All consonants except /, / can occur either double or single in the medial position.
 In south and southeastern Gondi dialects, the initial s is turning into h and getting deleted for some.
 Hill-Maṛia dialect of Gondi has a uvular r which corresponds to the r̠ in other Dravidian languages or *t̠ from proto Dravidian and it contrasts with the alveolar r corresponding to proto-Dravidian *r.

Vowels

Morphology

Nouns 
Gondi has derivative suffixes to denote gender for certain special words: -a:l and -o:r for masculine, and -a:r for feminine. Plural suffixes are also divided into masculine and feminine,  -r is used for most masculine nouns, -ir ends masculine nouns ending in -e, and -ur ends nouns ending in -o or -or. For instance:

kandi - boy kandir - boys

kalle - thief kallir - thieves

tottor - ancestor tottur - ancestors

are all masculine.

For non-masculine nouns, there are more suffixes: -n, -ik, -k, and a null suffix -ɸ

Before case markers are added, all nouns have an oblique marker. The oblique markers are -d-, -t-, -n-, -ṭ-, and -ɸ.

For instance:

kay-d-e: "in the hand"

Gondi has several case markers.

Genitive case markers are -na, -va, -a.

 -na is used after na:r, meaning village. -va is used after personal and reflexive pronouns.
 -a is used elsewhere.

Dialects
Most of the Gondi dialects are still inadequately recorded and described. The more important dialects are Dorla, Koya, Madiya, Muria, and Raj Gond. Some basic phonologic features separate the northwestern dialects from the southeastern. One is the treatment of the original initial s, which is preserved in northern and western Gondi, while farther to the south and east it has been changed to h; in some other dialects it has been lost completely. Other dialectal variations in the Gondi language are the alteration of initial r with initial l and a change of e and o to a.

In 2015, the ISO 639 code for the "Southern Gondi language", "ggo", was deprecated and split into two codes, Aheri Gondi (esg) and Adilabad Gondi (wsg).

Sana

Gondi writing can be split into two categories: that using its own writing systems and that using writing systems also used for other languages.

For lack of a widespread native script, Gondi is often written in Devanagari and Telugu scripts.

In 1928, Munshi Mangal Singh Masaram designed a native script based on Brahmi characters and in the same format of an Indian alphasyllabary. This script did not become widely used, although it is being encoded in Unicode. Most Gonds remain illiterate.

A native script that dates up to 1750 has been discovered by a group of researchers from the University of Hyderabad. It's usually named Gunjala Gondi Lipi, after the place where it was found. According to Maharashtra Oriental Manuscripts Library and Research Centre of India, a dozen manuscripts were found in this script. Programs to create awareness and promotion of this script among the Gondi people are in development stage. The Gunjala Gondi Lipi has witnessed a surge in prominence, and well-supported efforts are being undertaken in villages of northern Andhra Pradesh to widen its usage.

References

Further reading
 Beine, David K. 1994. A Sociolinguistic Survey of the Gondi-speaking Communities of Central India. M.A. thesis. San Diego State University. 516 p.
 Chenevix Trench, Charles. Grammar of Gondi: As Spoken in the Betul District, Central Provinces, India; with Vocabulary, Folk-Tales, Stories and Songs of the Gonds / Volume 1 - Grammar. Madras: Government Press, 1919.
 Hivale, Shamrao, and Verrier Elwin. Songs of the Forest; The Folk Poetry of the Gonds. London: G. Allen & Unwin, ltd, 1935.
 Moss, Clement F. An Introduction to the Grammar of the Gondi Language. [Jubbalpore?]: Literature Committee of the Evangelical National Missionary Society of Sweden, 1950.
 Pagdi, Setumadhava Rao. A Grammar of the Gondi Language. [Hyderabad-Dn: s.n, 1954.
 Subrahmanyam, P. S. Descriptive Grammar of Gondi Annamalainagar: Annamalai University, 1968.

External links

 Parable of the prodigal son in Gondi language, (Audio recording dated 1917)
 Specimen of the languages of the Gond tribes
 Gondi-English-Hindi-Marathi-Telugu dictionary

Agglutinative languages
Dravidian languages
Languages of Madhya Pradesh
Languages of Maharashtra
Languages of Telangana
Languages of Andhra Pradesh
Endangered languages of India
Vulnerable languages